Munak and adjacent Kheri Munak is a village and development block in Assandh sub-district of Karnal district, Haryana, India. Munak canal, which diverts Western Yamuna Canal's water to New Delhi, originates here at Munak regulator.

History
Munak Canal was constructed in British Raj, Canal Rest house also construed in British Raj and still it is in very good condition.

The rest house is maintaining by Irrigation Department of Haryana.
Ahttps://youtu.be/aXSX3QxPJRY video of munak village showing historical beauty of munak village..

Munak canal was Re-constructed here from 2003 to 2012.

It was upgraded to a block in October 2016 by the Chief Minister Manohar Lal Khattar's administration.

Demography
It has a population 20,000 people in 3500 households, as per 2011 census of India.

Education
Maharana Pratap Horticultural University, Karnal  is located at Anjanthali near Munak.

Govt. Ser sec SCHOOL MUNAK

Govt primary school , MUNAK

Govt girls high school, MUNAK

Bharat public school ,  MUNAK

Maharana Pratap public school , MUNAK

Maa vashno international school , MUNAK

Aryakulam international school , MUNAK

Sarswati public school , MUNAK

References

Villages in Karnal district
Karnal